Hesar-e Devin (also Romanized as Ḩeşār-e Devīn; also known as Ḩeşār) is a village in Howmeh Rural District, in the Central District of Shirvan County, North Khorasan Province, Iran. At the 2006 census, its population was 433, in 117 families.

References 

Populated places in Shirvan County